Galium oreganum (Oregon bedstraw) is a plant species in the family Rubiaceae. It is native to British Columbia, Washington, Oregon, and northern California (Siskiyou and Del Norte Counties).

References

External links

USDA Plants Profile
Wildflowers of the Pacific Northwest, Turner Photographics (Bellingham Washington USA), Oregon bedstraw
Gardening Europe

oreganum
Flora of Oregon
Flora of California
Flora of Washington (state)
Flora of British Columbia
Plants described in 1894
Flora without expected TNC conservation status